Wolfville is a Canadian town in the Annapolis Valley, Kings County, Nova Scotia, located about  northwest of the provincial capital, Halifax. The town is home to Acadia University and Landmark East School.

The town is a tourist destination due to its views of Cape Blomidon, the Bay of Fundy and Gaspereau Valley, as well as its wine industry. The downtown portion of Wolfville is home to pubs, bars, cafes and shops. Wolfville is also home to the Acadia Cinema Cooperative, a non-profit organization that runs the local movie/performance house. In the past few years, several Victorian houses in Wolfville have been converted to bed and breakfast establishments.

History

First Nations
From ancient times, the area of Wolfville was a hunting ground for First Nations peoples, including the Clovis, Laurentian, Bear River, and Shields Archaic groups. They were attracted by the salmon in the Gaspereau River and the agate stone at Cape Blomidon, with which they could make stone tools.

Many centuries before European contact, Mi'kmaq people, related to the Algonquin and Ojibwe peoples, migrated into Nova Scotia. The Mi'kmaq were seasonal hunters, using dogs and traveling on webbed snowshoes to hunt deer. They used the various semi-precious stones (including jasper, quartz, and even amethyst) from the Blomidon area to make arrowheads.

French rule
After an initial effort in 1604 by Pierre Dugua, Sieur de Mons and his cartographer Samuel de Champlain to establish a colony at Saint Croix Island, the colony was relocated to the Habitation at Port-Royal. The French and the Mi'kmaq quickly established a reciprocal trading relationship which continued to serve both peoples well until the mid eighteenth-century. The French found the area to be rich in furs and fine fertile land. Reports sent to France by individuals such as Samuel de Champlain, Marc Lescarbot and Nicolas Denys proclaimed the rich bounty to be found in the Annapolis Valley area.

French settlement efforts continued in fits and starts. By 1636 under Charles de Menou d'Aulnay, Port Royal was reestablished after Acadia/Nova Scotia was transferred from England to the French under the Treaty of Saint-Germain-en-Laye. The progeny of these settlers, as well as the second wave of settlers under Hector d'Andigné de Grandfontaine, would eventually become known as the Acadians.  By the late 1690s their population numbered about 350.

French settlement in the Wolfville area began in about 1680, when Pierre Melanson established his family at Grand-Pré. The Acadians prospered as farmers by enclosing the estuarine salt marshes with dykes, and successfully converting the reclaimed lands into fertile fields for crops and pasturage. In 1710, however, Acadia was lost by the French crown after the English laid siege to Port Royal/Annapolis Royal. Under the 1713 Treaty of Utrecht, signed at the close of the War of the Spanish Succession, Acadia was ceded for the final time to the British.

For the next thirty-six years, until the establishment of Halifax in 1749, the British remained at Annapolis Royal and Canso. The French-speaking Catholic population grew over the intervening years to well over 10,000 and the Minas region (Wolfville and environs) quickly became the principal settlement.  Acadia was a borderland region between two empires, and this caused a complex socio-political environment to develop for the Acadians. Both the British and the French coaxed and threatened the Acadians in attempts to secure their loyalty as is evidenced by the various oaths of allegiance each side attempted to extract from them. This complex situation led many Acadians to attempt to maintain a neutral path; while others openly supported either the French or the British. During the War of the Austrian Succession, the Acadians in the Wolfville area were implicated in the Battle of Grand Pré, during which a French Canadian military force, reinforced by Mi'kmaq and Acadians, defeated a British force.

With the onset of the Seven Years' War between Great Britain and France, the Acadians in the Wolfville area, along with all Acadians in peninsular Nova Scotia, suffered under the deportations that took place during the British Expulsion of the Acadians (see also the Bay of Fundy Campaign). Beginning in September 1755 and continuing into the fall, approximately 2,000 Acadians were deported from the area around Wolfville. The villages lying beyond Grand-Pré were burned by the British forces, and still more buildings were destroyed by both sides during the guerrilla war that took place until 1758.

British rule

Around 1760, the British government in Nova Scotia made several township plots of land available in the Annapolis Valley for colonization by English settlers. Horton Township was created in the Grand-Pré/Wolfville Area. Because of pressure on agricultural lands in New England, Anglophone farmers moved north in search of fertile land at a reasonable price. It is thought that between 1760 and 1789, more than 8,000 people known as New England Planters immigrated to the land around the Annapolis Valley. In 1763, there were 154 families living in the area of Horton Township.

The New England Planters set up a primarily agricultural economy, exporting cattle, potatoes, and grain, and later apples, as well as developing lumbering and shipbuilding. They settled and re-used the same dyke-lands as the Acadians had used before them, repairing and later expanding the agricultural dykes. They developed a major expansion in 1808, the three-mile-long Wickwire Dyke, which connected the Wolfville and Grand Pre dykes. This allowed the agricultural development of an additional 8,000 acres. The town site for Horton was initially surveyed in the Grand-Pré area at Horton Landing near the mouth of the Gaspereau River.  However, the town developed around the sheltered harbour on the Cornwallis River at Wolfville, at first known as Mud Creek.

The first official record of a Baptist church in Canada was that of the Horton Baptist Church (now Wolfville), established on October 29, 1778. The church was established with the assistance of the New Light evangelist Henry Alline.  The Baptist movement remained strong in the area. In 1838 Acadia University was founded as a Baptist college.

In 1830, the town of Mud Creek changed its name to Wolfville, in honour of Elisha DeWolf, the town's postmaster at the time. In the mid-19th century, Wolfville was renowned as the world's smallest port.  The town became part of Canada with Confederation in 1867.

Canada
The Windsor and Annapolis Railway arrived in 1868, later becoming the Dominion Atlantic Railway. Wolfville became a seaport devoted principally to the export of apples from the orchards of the fertile Annapolis Valley. Wolfville Harbour was also a terminus of the MV Kipawo ferry, the last of a long succession of ferries that connected Wolfville, Kingsport and Parrsboro for 200 years. The harbour, which empties twice a day due to the high tides of the Bay of Fundy, was once described by Robert Ripley as the smallest in the world. On March 20, 1893, the Town was incorporated, with Dr. E. Perry Bowles elected as its first mayor.

In 1985, the town was declared a nuclear free zone. Wolfville was declared Canada's first fair trade town on April 17, 2007. In May 2016, Wolfville was designated as the third Cittaslow in Canada.

Demographics 

With Acadia University having a full time student population of 3,765, the population can fluctuate greatly with the school semesters.

Arts and culture 
The Acadia University Art Gallery and The Festival Theatre are both located on Main Street, along with many bistros and boutiques. The town's history is presented at the Randall House Museum, operated by the Wolfville Historical Society. Each year, the Annapolis Valley Music Festival is held at Acadia Campus, where musicians from across the valley compete. Wolfville hosts two annual arts festivals, the Deep Roots Music Festival in September and Devour! The Food Film Fest in late October.

The Al Whittle Theatre operated by the Acadia Cinema Cooperative has for generations served as a nexus of culture and entertainment for the town's populace. Opened in 1911 and operating as an opera house until 1923 when it became a community theater and cinema, the theater underwent various changes in ownership until 1997 under the management of Acadia Cinems. With the retirement of its long-serving manager Al Whittle (1929-2021), the theater closed in 2000. In 2004, the theater was re-opened by the Acadia Cinema Cooperative Ltd. and named in honour of Al Whittle. The theater has continued to serve as a local gathering place and centre for the arts ever since, from hosting local theater productions to screening international independent films.

Wolfville has a farmers market located in the DeWolfe building, a former apple packing warehouse. In July 2022, the town will host the first ever Annapolis Valley Pride Festival.

The library is Wolfville Memorial Library.

Education
 Acadia University
 Landmark East School
 Wolfville School
 Horton High School

Notable people
Joseph Barss, privateer
Bob Chambers (1905-1996), political cartoonist
Alex Colville (1920–2013) WWII artist
Gilbert Lafayette Foster, 6th Canadian Surgeon General
William Hall (1827–1904), third Canadian to receive the Victoria Cross.
Arthur Chute McGill (1926–1980) theologian and philosopher
Eddy (M) Melanson was born in Wolfville, Nova Scotia, on July 25, 1938.
Mona Louise Parsons (1901–1976) member of the Dutch resistance, WW2

Parks
Canada Parks
Lumsden Pond Provincial Park
Reservoir Park
Rotary Park

See also
 List of municipalities in Nova Scotia

References

External links

Town of Wolfville Municipal Web Site

Communities in Kings County, Nova Scotia
Towns in Nova Scotia
General Service Areas in Nova Scotia
1755 establishments in the French colonial empire